The Koenigsegg Jesko is a limited production mid-engine sports car produced by Swedish automobile manufacturer Koenigsegg. The car was introduced at the 2019 Geneva Motor Show and it completely sold out before the 2019 Geneva Motor Show ended. The car succeeds the Agera. The name Jesko is a tribute to the company founder's father, Jesko von Koenigsegg. There are two variations of the car – "Absolut" (top speed) and "Attack" (track-focused).

Specifications

Engine 

The engine is a development of the 5.0-litre twin-turbocharged V8 engine used in the Agera.

Changes from the Agera's engine include the use of a new 180-degree flat-plane crankshaft that saves  and increases the redline from 8,250 rpm to 8,500 rpm. The Jesko also utilises active rubber mounts from the Regera that reduce engine vibrations in the cabin. The engine has pressure sensors for each cylinder in order to achieve real time cylinder monitoring for the multipoint fuel injection system.

Transmission 
The engine is mated to an in-house developed 9-speed multi-clutch transmission called the "Light Speed Transmission (LST)" by the manufacturer. It has 9 forward gear combinations using a layout with an input shaft with 3 fixed gears which is mated to a secondary shaft with 3 gears fixed to the output shaft and 3 clutched gears mated to the input shaft and an output shaft with 4 clutched gears (one set is used for reverse which mates directly to the input shaft), allowing the transmission to change gears without an interruption in power delivery due to the speedy nature of clutch actuation and overlap between the clutches opening and closing. The engine's crankshaft is mated directly to the LST and uses the rotating mass of the transmission components in place of a traditional flywheel. The transmission has a shift time ranging from 20 to 30 milliseconds. It also has an overdrive mode called "Ultimate Power on Demand" that is designed to skip directly to the optimal gear depending on user input, rather than down or upshifting sequentially to that gear.

The transmission is controlled by an onboard computer which uses engine and road speed data to engage a gear. Gears are selected by the driver either using the shift paddles mounted on the steering column or the gear selector.

Chassis and suspension 

Unlike its predecessors, the high-downforce Attack variant of the Jesko has Koenigsegg's 'Triplex' dampers at the front and the rear combined with traditional Öhlins dampers. A horizontal rear damper prevents the rear from pressing on the ground during hard acceleration. The front dampers stabilise the car at high speeds while active rear wheel steering ensures further stability at all performance levels.

The carbon body tub used in the Jesko is  longer and  wider from that of its predecessor in order for more passenger room. The tub has been redesigned and incorporates an aluminium monocoque structure for increased rigidity.

Wheels, brakes and tires 

The car comes standard with forged aluminium centre lock wheels, with diameters of 20 inches at the front and 21 inches at the rear. The tyres are Michelin Pilot Sport Cup 2's with codes of 265/35 20 for the front and 345/30 21 for the rear. Michelin Pilot Sport Cup 2 R tyres dedicated for track driving are also available as an option. The braking system uses ventilated carbon-ceramic discs.

Interior 

The use of a redesigned monocoque improves leg and headroom in the interior of the Jesko when compared to previous Koenigsegg models. Though weight saving is a priority for interior features, the car is still equipped with amenities such as a climate control system, an infotainment system with a 9.0-inch screen, Apple CarPlay and USB phone charging. The car has unique screens mounted in the steering wheel spokes and a 5.0-inch screen mounted behind the steering wheel displaying vital information to the driver. The seats will be made from hollow carbon fibre but will be electrically adjustable.

Exterior 

The Jesko shares Koenigsegg's 'Autoskin' capabilities from the Regera, allowing for remote operation of doors and the hood. It is also possible to hydraulically lift the front and rear axles of the car to give additional ground clearance. The doors have been redesigned so that they open further outward and have more ground clearance while open. The roof has screws in order to ensure it remains in place during high speed driving.

Production 
Production of the Jesko will be limited to 125 units, with 40–50 units being produced each year. Unlike its predecessors, the Jesko will be homologated worldwide. It was announced in March 2019 that all the build slots of the Jesko were sold out.

The Jesko will be offered in either a high-downforce Attack or low-drag Absolut configuration, with subtle differences between the two variants. The Attack variant, as shown at the 2019 Geneva Motor Show, comes equipped with the dual front and rear 'Triplex' damper system and added aerodynamic features for track use. Due to this dual suspension setup, it is not possible to store the Targa roof in the front of the car, although this is possible in the Absolut as it will not have a front 'Triplex' damper system or front hood air dam. In July 2021, Koenigsegg revealed the first pre-series production Jesko and claimed that the first Jesko customer cars are slated for delivery in spring 2022. , no customer cars had been delivered.

Variants

Jesko Attack
The Jesko Attack is the high-downforce, default version of the Jesko.

Jesko Absolut

Unveiled online alongside the Gemera on 3 March 2020, the Jesko Absolut is a high speed version of the Jesko. The front splitter and side winglets are removed and the front louvers are smoother with the rear wheels featuring removable covers for high speed stability. The vehicle is also slightly elongated featuring a rear extension which adds  of additional length. The engine and transmission remain the same as the Jesko Attack. 3,000 hours were spent on the aerodynamic analysis while an additional 5,000 hours were spent design and engineering work of the Absolut. The Absolut will be priced higher than the Jesko due to the development work taken to lower the drag coefficient.

Awards
 Top Gear – Award 2022 – Hypercar of the Year

See also 
 List of production cars by power output

References

External links 

 

Jesko
Rear mid-engine, rear-wheel-drive vehicles
Sports cars
Cars introduced in 2019
Flagship vehicles
2020s cars